Christine Sharp (18 November 1947 – 18 May 2021) was an Australian politician, who was a Greens member of the Western Australian Legislative Council representing South West Region from 1997 to 2005.

Early life

Born in London, Sharp completed a Bachelor of Arts with Honours at the University of Sheffield, and a Master of Arts (Political Science) at the University of Kent. She travelled widely before coming to Western Australia in 1973, later completing a PhD at Murdoch University on politics and ethics.

In 1974 and 1975, Sharp was a journalist for the ABC, and during that time was a prominent activist in Western Australia's burgeoning forest movement.  In 1977, Sharp moved with her partner from the city to a farm in Balingup, where she started a local business as a tree farmer.

Sharp was a member of the Environmental Protection Authority from her appointment in 1989 to 1995.

Political career

Sharp served on the Donnybrook-Balingup Shire Council.

In the 1989 state election, Sharp worked for the Greens candidate for the South West Region, Louise Duxbury, on policy development.

In 1997, Sharp was elected to the Western Australian Legislative Council as a Greens member representing South West Region. She held the seat until her retirement in 2005.

She died in Bridgetown on 18 May 2021, aged 73.

References

1947 births
2021 deaths
Politicians from London
English emigrants to Australia
Greens Western Australia politicians
Australian Greens members of the Parliament of Western Australia
Members of the Western Australian Legislative Council
21st-century Australian politicians
Women members of the Western Australian Legislative Council
21st-century Australian women politicians
20th-century Australian politicians
20th-century Australian women politicians
Alumni of the University of Sheffield
Alumni of the University of Kent